International Exposition Metro Station is a station of Mashhad Metro Line 1. The station opened on 10 October 2011. It is located on Vakilabad Expressway.

References

Mashhad Metro stations
Railway stations opened in 2011